Mark Edward Womack (born 9 January 1961) is an English actor, known for starring in Liverpool 1, Sorted and Willy Russell's Dancin thru' The Dark. In 2020, he appeared in the ITV soap opera Emmerdale as DI Mark Malone.

Personal life
Womack was born in Liverpool in 1961, eldest son of Frances (née Dean) and Tom Womack. He has a younger brother and sister.

He attended high school in Childwall, Liverpool, and later attended RADA, London.

Womack married Mary Therese McGoldrick in 1995. They had one son together before their 1997 divorce. Womack soon began a relationship with his married Liverpool 1 costar Samantha Janus. Janus' marriage ended in divorce in 1998, and she and Womack married on 16 May 2009. They have two children together. In August 2020, Janus announced that she and Womack had separated in 2018; but were still living together in the same house with their children.

Filmography

Film

Television

References

External links 

1961 births
20th-century English male actors
21st-century English male actors
Alumni of RADA
English male television actors
Living people
Male actors from Liverpool
People from Childwall